Tarana Abbasova (original name: Təranə Abbasova (born 13 January 1967) was an Azerbaijani female weightlifter, competing in the 58 kg category and representing Azerbaijan at international competitions. 

She participated at the 2000 Summer Olympics in the 53 kg event. She competed at world championships, most recently at the 1999 World Weightlifting Championships.

Major results

References

External links
 
 http://www.todor66.com/weightlifting/World/1998/Women_under_53kg.html
 http://www.todor66.com/olim/2000/Weightlifting/Women_under_53kg.html
 http://www.gettyimages.com.au/photos/tarana-abbasova?excludenudity=true&sort=mostpopular&mediatype=photography&phrase=tarana%20abbasova

1967 births
Living people
Azerbaijani female weightlifters
Weightlifters at the 2000 Summer Olympics
Olympic weightlifters of Azerbaijan
Place of birth missing (living people)